The 2020 Riga City Council election was held from 26 to 29 August 2020 to elect the 60 members of Riga City Council. The election was initially scheduled for 25 April 2020, and then rescheduled three times – once due to a court ruling and twice due to the COVID-19 pandemic in Latvia, to 2 May, 6 June, and 29 August. The council will be elected for nearly five years instead of the standard four, and the next election is scheduled to take place in 2025, at the same time as all other municipal elections in Latvia.

Background 
In the 2017 Riga City Council election, the political alliance of Harmony (SKDS) and Honor to serve Riga (GKR) lost 7 seats but held on to their absolute majority with 32 seats out of 60. Nils Ušakovs was re-elected as the mayor of Riga, and served until 4 April 2019, when the Latvian minister for Environmental Protection and Regional Development Juris Pūce fired him. On 31 May Dainis Turlais from GKR was elected as the new mayor of Riga, but was ousted by a vote of no-confidence on 20 June, after just 21 days in the position. On 19 August Oļegs Burovs from GKR was elected as the new mayor of Riga, and served until 24 February 2020, when the City Council was officially dissolved.

Opinion polls

Results
The coalition of the centrist Development/For! alliance and centre-left The Progressives (both new entities which did not participate in the prior elections) obtained a plurality of votes and seats. The election resulted in both parties of the governing coalition (Social Democratic Party "Harmony" and Honor to serve Riga) lose seats, and saw their combined vote share decline by nearly half. The Latvian Russian Union returned to the city council for the first time since 2009, obtaining four seats, while the New Conservative Party saw their seat count drop by five. The Union of Greens and Farmers fell less than 1% short of the 5% threshold needed to enter the council.

As no party held a majority, a coalition was needed, with 31 seats needed for a majority coalition.

References

Politics of Riga
Local elections in Latvia
2020 in Latvia
Riga